The jig is a form of lively folk dance in compound metre, as well as the accompanying dance tune. It first gained popularity in 16th-century England, Ireland, Scotland, and other parts of the British Isles, and was adopted on mainland Europe where it eventually became the final movement of the mature Baroque dance suite (the French gigue; Italian and Spanish giga). Today it is most associated with Irish dance music, Scottish country dance and the Métis people in Canada. Jigs were originally in duple compound metre, (e.g.,  time), but have been adapted to a variety of time signatures, by which they are often classified into groups, including double jigs, slip jigs and single jigs.

Origins

The term jig was probably derived from the French giguer, meaning ‘to jump’ or the Italian giga. The use of “jig” in Irish dance derives from the Irish  jigeánnai, itself borrowed from the Old English giga meaning ‘old dance’. It was known as a dance in 16th-century England, often in  time, and the term was used for a post-play entertainment featuring dance in early modern England, but which ‘probably employed a great variety
of dances, solo (suitable for jigs), paired, round, country or courtly’; in Playford's Dancing Master (1651) ‘the dance game in “Kemps Jegg” is a typical scenario from a dramatic jig and it is likely that the combination of dance metre for steps and non-metrical passages for pantomime indicates how a solo or ensemble jig might have been danced by stage players.’ Later the dance began to be associated with music particularly in  time, and with slip jigs  time.

Ireland and Scotland
During the 17th century the dance was adopted in Ireland and Scotland, where it was widely adapted, and the jig is now most often associated with these countries, especially Ireland. The jig is second in popularity only to the reel in traditional Irish dance; it is popular but somewhat less common in Scottish country dance music. It is transcribed in compound metre, being  time. The most common structure of a jig is two eight-bar parts, performing two different steps, each once on the right foot, and one on the left foot.  As with most other types of dance tunes in Irish music, at a session or a dance it is common for two or more jigs to be strung together in a set, flowing on without interruption.

In Irish step dance

The following distinction is primarily observed in modern competitive Irish dance and should not be confused with the general notion of how the jigs are played and classified among traditional Irish musicians.

Light jigs

A light jig is the second-fastest of all jigs. The performer's feet rarely leave the ground for long, as the step is fast, typically performed at a speed around 116 at feiseanna. There are several light jig steps, varying with each dance school, but the rising step, or the rise and grind, is standard in almost all light jigs. The right side version of the rising step is performed by putting weight on the left foot, lifting the right foot off the ground then hopping on the left foot once. Hop on the left foot again, bringing the right foot back behind the left foot and then shift the weight onto the right foot, leaving the left foot in the air. Dancers use the phrase "hop, hop back" for these three movements, and there is a slight pause between the hop, and hop back. The next movement is a hop on the right foot. Then shift the weight, left-right-left-right. The phrase for this whole movement is: "hop, hop back, hop back 2-3-4." To do the step on the left foot, reverse the left and right directions.

Slip jigs
Slip jigs are in  time. Because of the longer measures, they are longer than the reel and the light jig, with the same number of bars to the music. The dance is performed high on the toes, and is often considered the "ballet of Irish dance" because of its graceful movements that seem to slip the performers across the floor. Slip jigs are performed at a speed of 113 bpm at feiseanna.

Single and double jigs

Musically, the single jig tends to follow the pattern of a quarter note followed by an eighth note (twice per  bar), whereas the pattern for the double jig is three eighth notes twice per  bar.

Hop jigs
Hop jigs are the fastest of all jigs next to light jigs, but the term hop jig causes some confusion, as some people use it for a single jig, while others use this term to refer to a tune in  time.

Among the latter, some do not distinguish it from a slip jig, while some reserve the term to a slip jig variant that has special characteristics, in particular an emphasis on quarter note–eighth note pairs.

Treble jigs
Treble jigs (also called the hard or heavy jig) are performed in hard shoes, and also to a  time metre. They are characterized by stomps, trebles, and clicks. Many set dances are performed in treble jig time, a few being Drunken Gauger, Blackthorn Stick, The Three Sea Captains, and St Patrick's Day. Two types of treble jigs are performed at feiseanna: the traditional and non-traditional (slow) treble jigs. Beginners will do a treble jig at traditional speed (92 bpm), while more advanced dancers will dance the non-traditional (slow) treble jig at 72 bpm.

Straight and sand jigs
In 19th-century America, the jig was the name adopted for a form of step dancing developed by enslaved African-Americans and later adopted by minstrel show performers. Jig dancers employed a repertoire of "hits" on the heel or toe, ""hops" on one foot, "springs" off both feet as well as various slides and shuffles. The most famous early jig dancer was Master Juba, an African-American who inspired a host of white imitators, many of whom performed in blackface. John Diamond, an Irish-American who competed with Master Juba in a series of "challenge dances," was among the most prominent of these white minstrel jig dancers. Minstrel jigs, as well as clogs and breakdowns, were crucial to the evolution of 20th-century tap and soft-shoe dancing.

A variant of the straight jig was the "sand jig" or "sand dance," performed as a series of shuffles and slides on a sand-strewn stage. The most prominent sand jiggers of the 19th century were two women, both born in New York in 1855: Buffalo native Kitty O'Neil and her Manhattan-born rival Kitty Sharpe. Sand dancing was a staple of minstrelsy, variety and vaudeville, and was kept alive in later decades largely by African-American tap dancers, including John Bubbles, Bill "Bojangles" Robinson, Sammy Davis Jr., Harriet Browne and, most prominently, Howard "Sandman" Sims.

See also
Shakespearean dance
The Irish Washerwoman
Swing

References

Notes

Bibliography

External links
Irish footwork

British folk music
English folk dance
Irish folk music
Scottish folk music
Welsh folk music
English country dance
Scottish country dance
Baroque dance
Renaissance dance
European dances
Competitive dance
Folk dances
Irish dances
Scottish dances
British music
English music
Irish music
Welsh music